The Charles C. Vineyard House is a historic house located in Eden, Idaho.

Description and history
The house was designed by Mrs. Charles C. Vineyard. It was built in 1920 by mason Mr. Christopherson and carpenter Bob Homes. On September 8, 1983, it was listed on the National Register of Historic Places as a part of a group of lava rock buildings in south central Idaho.

See also
 Basalt
 Historic preservation
 National Register of Historic Places listings in Jerome County, Idaho

References

External links
 * 

1920 establishments in Idaho
Bungalow architecture in Idaho
Houses completed in 1920
Houses in Jerome County, Idaho
Houses on the National Register of Historic Places in Idaho
National Register of Historic Places in Jerome County, Idaho